You may select one of the following skins for optimal viewing of Harry James' discography: 

The discography of American trumpeter and band leader Harry James includes 30 studio albums, 47 EPs, three soundtrack/stage and screen albums, and numerous live albums and compilation albums, along with contributions as sideman and appearances with other musicians.
James released over 200 singles during his career, with nine songs reaching number one, 32 in the top ten, and 70 in the top 100 on the U.S. pop charts, as well as seven charting on the U.S. R&B chart.
As of 2016, two recordings of Harry James had been inducted into the Grammy Hall of Fame, a special Grammy award established in 1973 to honor recordings that are at least 25 years old, and that have "qualitative or historical significance".

The list includes releases attributed to "Harry James and His Orchestra," "Harry James and His Big Band," "Harry James and The Boogie Woogie Trio," "Frank Sinatra and Harry James," "James and Forrest," "Kitty Kallen with Harry James," "Rosemary Clooney and Harry James," "Harry James and His Orchestra and Doris Day," "Harry James with Rhythm," "Harry James and His Music Makers," "Harry James and His Western Friends," "Harry James and Toni Harper," "The Harry James Octet," "Harry James and His New Jazz Band," "Harry James and the Quintet," "Members of The Harry James Orchestra," or simply "Harry James." As of the initial release on Wikipedia, this discography only includes vinyl/shellac releases in the United States.

Notes

As leader

Singles 
Dates shown in the Singles tables below are recording dates. Singles are grouped into tables according to the release year. Some singles were not immediately released or were re-issued, so the year of the recording date may not match the year of release. This is especially evident during the 1942–1944 musicians' strike, which started on July 31, 1942, and lasted through November 11, 1944, for the Columbia label. Striking musicians were prohibited from recording in the studio during this time, so the record labels released unissued recordings from their stockpiles, or they re-issued recordings from previous years. A second musicians' strike lasted from January 1, 1948 through December 1948.

U.S. peak chart positions are from Joel Whitburn's Pop Memories 1890–1954: The History of American Popular Music. Chart dates shown are from the same source and are the date the song first charted. R&B chart positions are from MusicVF.com and Barry Kowal's HitsOfAllDecades.com. At the time of James's charts, Billboard magazine referred to the R&B chart as "The Harlem Hit Parade".

10" 78 rpm singles, 1938 

Notes

10" 78 rpm singles, 1939 

Notes

10" 78 rpm singles, 1940 

Notes

10" 78 rpm singles, 1941 

Notes

10" 78 rpm singles, 1942 

Notes

10" 78 rpm singles, 1943 

Notes

10" 78 rpm singles, 1944 

Notes

10" 78 rpm singles, 1945 

Notes

10" 78 rpm singles, 1946 

Notes

10" 78 rpm singles, 1947 

Notes

10" 78 rpm singles, 1948 

Notes

10" 78 rpm and 7" 33 rpm singles, 1949 

Notes

10" 78 rpm and 7" 33 rpm singles, 1950 

Notes

10" 78 rpm and 7" 45 rpm singles, 1951 

Notes

10" 78 rpm and 7" 45 rpm singles, 1952 

Notes

10" 78 rpm and 7" 45 rpm singles, 1953-1966 

Notes

7" 45 rpm single reissues

10" 78 rpm and 7" 45 rpm box sets

7" 33 and 45 rpm EPs and EP sets 

Notes

Albums and album box sets

Studio albums 

Notes

Live albums

Soundtrack / Stage & Screen albums 

Notes

Compilation albums 

Notes

Re-issue albums 

Notes

Appearances and multiple-artist compilations

10" 78 rpm singles 

Notes

10" 78 rpm and 7" 45 rpm singles 

Notes

10" 78 rpm and 7" 45 rpm box sets

7" 45 rpm EPs

Albums and album box sets

Studio albums

Live albums

Soundtrack / Stage & Screen albums

Compilation albums 

Notes

Harry James Orchestra (minus Harry James)

Albums 

Notes

References

Jazz discographies
Discographies of American artists